Small nuclear ribonucleoprotein Sm D1 is a protein that in humans is encoded by the SNRPD1 gene.

Function 

This gene encodes a small nuclear ribonucleoprotein that belongs to the SNRNP core protein family. The protein may act as a charged protein scaffold to promote SNRNP assembly or strengthen SNRNP-SNRNP interactions through nonspecific electrostatic contacts with RNA.

Interactions 

Small nuclear ribonucleoprotein D1 has been shown to interact with:
 CDC5L, 
 CLNS1A, 
 DDX20, 
 SMN1, and
 Small nuclear ribonucleoprotein D2

References

Further reading